"Ave maris stella" (Latin for 'Hail, star of the sea') is a medieval Marian hymn, usually sung at Vespers. It was especially popular in the Middle Ages and has been used by many composers as the basis of other compositions.

Background 
Authorship of the original hymn has been attributed to several people, including Bernard of Clairvaux (12th century), Saint Venantius Fortunatus (6th century) and Hermannus Contractus (11th century). Probably originating in the 9th century, it appears as a 10th century addition in two 9th-century manuscripts, one from Salzburg now in Vienna and the other still at the Abbey of Saint Gall. Its frequent occurrence in the Divine Office made it popular in the Middle Ages, many other hymns being founded upon it. The "Ave maris stella" was highly influential in presenting Mary as a merciful and loving Mother. "Much of its charm is due to its simplicity". The title "Star of the Sea" is one of the oldest and most widespread titles applied to Mary. The hymn is frequently used as a prayer for safe-conduct for travelers.

The melody is found in the Irish plainsong "Gabhaim Molta Bríde", a piece in praise of St. Brigid of Kildaire. The popular modern hymn Hail Queen of Heaven, the Ocean Star, is loosely based on this plainsong original.

Latin lyrics 

The Latin text of the hymn as authorized for use in the Liturgy of the Hours of the Roman Rite (Ordinary Form) is the following:

Musical settings

The plainchant hymn has been developed by many composers from pre-baroque to the present day. The Roman Rite employs four different plainchant tunes for the Ave maris stella; the first three are designated for solemnities, feasts, and memorials of the Blessed Virgin Mary; a fourth is given in the Little Office of the Blessed Virgin Mary as an alternative to the memorial tone. The tunes have been used as the cantus firmus for some polyphonic settings of the mass, including those by Josquin and Victoria.

Renaissance settings include those by Hans Leo Hassler, Felice Anerio, Giovanni Pierluigi da Palestrina, Guillaume Dufay and William Byrd. Baroque settings include Monteverdi's Vespro della Beata Vergine 1610, one by Emperor Leopold I, one by Louis Couperin in 1658, four settings by Marc-Antoine Charpentier (H.60, H.63, H.65, H.67 1670–1680s), and Sébastien de Brossard. Romantic settings include those by Dvorak, Grieg, and Liszt. Modern composers who have either set the text or used the hymn as an inspiration include Marcel Dupré, Flor Peeters, Peter Maxwell Davies, James MacMillan, Jean Langlais, and others.

Acadian National Anthem
In 1884, the second Acadian national convention adopted "Ave maris stella" as the anthem of Acadia.

See also
 Our Lady, Star of the Sea
 Our Lady Star of the Sea Church (disambiguation)

References

External links

 
 

Canadian anthems
Acadian culture
Piae Cantiones
Marian hymns